Talbot Green ( "lea of the barns") is a town (and electoral ward) just north of the M4 motorway, in the County Borough of Rhondda Cynon Taf, Wales in the United Kingdom. The town is part of Llantrisant Community Council.

Geography
Talbot Green is  located at the mouth of the short and mountainous Ely Valley, between Mynydd Garthmaelwg (Llantrisant forest) and Y Graig (Llantrisant). The River Ely runs through along the town boundary before continuing to Pontyclun, running alongside the Warehouses of A F Blakemore & Son ltd, who run a portion of the SPAR UK retail chain. The town is bordered by the hill town of Llantrisant to the east, the Village of Pontyclun to the South and Llanharan a few miles to the West.

Transport

The area has links to the rest of Wales with the A4119 linking it in the south to the M4 Motorway, and to the north to the South Wales Valleys. The Talbot Green by-pass opened in 1991 to relieve traffic in the town through disabling access to or from Pontyclun via Cowbridge Road, and provided a shorter route for the A473 Bridgend to Pontypridd Road. In September 2010, a £90m by-pass linking Talbot Green to Pontypridd was opened. The by-pass is notable for its three dormouse bridges, built to protect the endangered animals.

A single track railway runs north from Pontyclun railway station (which is the towns nearest railway station), turning west at Talbot Green to run roughly parallel to the Afon Clun, alongside the north of the A473, and originally ran to the Cwm Coking Works at Tynant, Beddau. All the original railway infrastructure remains intact between Talbot Green and Pontyclun, including the track, signals and bridges. The track is still embedded in the road where it crosses the A473, the warning lights remain at the roadside and the roadsigns warn drivers to stop if they see warning lights flash at the level crossing. A recent consultative study (Sewta Rail Strategy Study—January 2006) has considered the possibility of reopening the Pontyclun to Beddau branch line, as a passenger line rather than just for freight. This would require new stations at Talbot Green, Llantrisant, Gwaun Meisgyn and Beddau (Tynant).

Retail parks
Talbot Green has two large retail parks, Glamorgan Vale retail park and Talbot Green shopping park.

Glamorgan Vale retail park
Glamorgan Vale retail park was opened circa 1996 and an extra unit was built in 2004 around the same time as the expansion of Talbot Green shopping park. It is located on the A473 Talbot Green bypass. It has the total of 11 shopping units and 1 fast food/drive thru restaurant.

Talbot Green shopping park
Talbot Green shopping park was opened circa 1996 initially with 3 units, then later to 14 shopping units and 1 fast food restaurant and 2 coffee shop within the store concessions in 2004/05 and expanded further again after one unit was divided into two in 2012 thus having a total of 15 shopping units. It expanded once again due to a conversion of a former Comet unit into a food quarter containing 3 restaurants and a coffee shop. The conversion started in May 2014 and was completed in late November with the restaurants and coffee shop opening in December 2014, thus dropping the shopping units back down to 14 and the food and drink outlets and concessions up to 7 now known collectively as 'Taste @ TG'. In early 2015, another retail unit was divided into 2 thus raising a total of shopping units back up to 15. Some units are located alongside the A4119 Talbot Green to Ynysmaerdy Dual Carriageway which are the older units (one of which has been converted to a food and drink outlet) and the other units are located on the former Tesco site and Newpark shopping precinct (which had independently run businesses that have subsequently moved elsewhere in the area or closed completely) after the former relocated in 2003 to the former site of the Homeworld Department store, which closed in 1999 and was demolished the following year and left derelict for several years.

There is also a Tesco Extra store, that was once the largest in Wales, after the store was expanded in 2005, but overtaken by the store in Culverhouse Cross, and later Fforestfach.

Facilities
The town also has a golf club, and industrial estates including Coedcae Lane and Lanelay Industrial Estate.

The Department Store Leekes is also situated in Talbot Green at Cowbridge Road, near Pontyclun.

The town also has a development of Offices, Hotel, Pub and a private Health facility which is located in Magden Park on the Ely Meadows alongside the A4119 Talbot Green to Ynysmeardy dual carriageway near the Royal Glamorgan Hospital. It also has the Avionics department of British Airways and is also the headquarters of the Welsh Blood Service.

Talbot Green's most significant building is Lanelay Hall, until recently the headquarters of the South Wales Fire and Rescue Service, who moved just over two miles away, to the former Buy As You View head office at Forest View Business Park, Ynysmaerdy, Llantrisant, in February 2009.

Governance
Talbot Green was an electoral ward to Rhondda Cynon Taf County Borough Council, bounded to the east by the A4119 road. It elected one county borough councillor. Between 1999 and 2017 representation was by Independent councillors but at the May 2017 election the seat was taken by Labour's Stephen Powell.

A 2018 review of electoral arrangements by the Local Democracy and Boundary Commission for Wales would see Talbot Green merged with the neighbouring Llantrisant Town ward to become 'Llantrisant and Talbot Green'. The proposals would take effect from the 2022 council elections.

Talbot Green is also a community ward for Llantrisant Community Council, electing three community councillors.

Future Developments
Improvements to the road network, in particular the A4119 linking the Rhondda Valleys to the M4, through Tonyrefail and Talbot Green, brought development pressure to the area around Llantrisant. Extensive housing development has taken place recently in the towns along the A473, the main Pontypridd to Bridgend road—linking Llantwit Fardre to Llantrisant, Talbot Green, Llanharan and Pencoed—the road that runs parallel to the Afon Clun from Rhiwsaeson to Pontyclun.

New Town centre scheme
In June 2011, it was announced there are proposals to make Talbot Green a "new town centre" by building a new supermarket, 40 shops, a multi screen cinema, cafes, restaurants, bars and a hotel. There will also be offices for local businesses, a range of civic and community facilities, apartments and houses. They are to be located on the former sites of Staedtler and Purolite and the surrounding brownfield land. The new scheme will include a new Leekes store to replace the existing one on the same site. The scheme is expected to create up to 1,900 jobs in the area. The scheme as of March 2013 had been given the greenlight by the local council, however development won't begin until the planning consent for the supermarket and a petrol filling station is granted. In May 2014 the new Sainsbury's supermarket had been given the green light to anchor the new town centre scheme with infrastructure works scheduled to begin in the autumn of 2014 and the development of the rest of the scheme will take place in due course. Work on the scheme officially began in February 2015 and is expected to be completed in the next 2 to 3 years. It has since stalled for unknown reasons.

References

External links 
 photos of Talbot Green and surrounding area
 Talbot Green shopping park

Villages in Rhondda Cynon Taf
Wards of Rhondda Cynon Taf
Llantrisant